Samantha Erin Vinograd (born February 17, 1983) is an American government official and foreign policy commentator who has served as the assistant secretary for counterterrorism and threat prevention in the Department of Homeland Security since 2022.

Early life and education
Vinograd was born and raised in Connecticut in a Jewish family, including her father who is a Holocaust survivor from France. Vinograd graduated from the Hopkins School in New Haven, Connecticut, in 2001. 

After high school, Vinograd attended the University of Pennsylvania and graduated in 2005 with a Bachelor of Arts degree in Asian and Middle Eastern studies. She later received a Master of Arts in security studies from Georgetown University.

Career
After her studies, Vinograd joined the U.S. Department of the Treasury, working as deputy attaché to Iraq and as an International Economist during the George W. Bush administration.

In August 2009, during the Obama administration, she began her tenure at the National Security Council, where she served as director for Iraq, director for international economics, and as senior advisor to National Security Advisor Thomas E. Donilon.

In 2013, she began to work for Goldman Sachs focusing on public-private sector partnerships. She later worked at Stripe, leading global public policy before joining CNN as a national security analyst. For several years, Vinograd was also a Senior Advisor at the Biden Institute at the University of Delaware.

She has worked as an advisor to the US Fund for UNICEF, was named a David E. Rockefeller Fellow at the Trilateral Commission, a Millennium Fellow at the Atlantic Council, and serves on the board of the Women's Foreign Policy Group. She co-founded Global Opportunity Advisors, a geopolitical risk and policy advisory firm, with Morgan Ortagus.

Vinograd began serving in the Biden administration as senior counselor for national security and acting assistant secretary for counterterrorism and threat prevention at the Department of Homeland Security in February 2021. She was promoted to assistant secretary for counterterrorism and threat prevention in August 2022.

References

External links

 "Presidential Weekly Briefing Weekly column by Samantha Vinograd for CNN.

1983 births
Living people
CNN people
Georgetown University alumni
Hopkins School alumni
University of Pennsylvania alumni
Jewish American journalists
United States government people of the Iraq War
American people of French-Jewish descent
George W. Bush administration personnel
Obama administration personnel
Biden administration personnel